Família Lima (lit. Lima Family) is a Brazilian band from Rio Grande do Sul state. As the name suggests, all members are part of the Lima family.

Members 
 Lucas Lima - lead vocals, electric guitar, acoustic guitar, viola, western concert flute, violin, bassoon
 Zeca Lima - cavaquinho, acoustic guitar, violin
 Allen Lima - keyboards
 Moisés Lima - bass, cello
 Amon-Rá Lima - violin

Discography 
Familia Lima (Som Livre, Platinum)
Familia Lima Ao Vivo (Som Livre)
Pra Você (Abril Music, Platinum)
Gira o Mundo (Abril Music, Gold)
Italiano (Abril Music)
DVD 10 Anos - ao vivo em Gramado
Carmina Burana (Antídoto)
1, 2, 3, 4, 5
DVD Raízes
DVD 20 Anos

References 

Musical groups established in 1994
Brazilian pop rock music groups
Family musical groups
1994 establishments in Brazil